Edamann railway station (code: EDN) is a railway station on Kollam–Sengottai branch line connecting Kollam district in Kerala with Tamil Nadu. Edamann railway station falls under the Madurai railway division of the Southern Railway zone of Indian Railways. It is an 'E-Class' railway station, currently acting as the terminal station for trains running on Kollam–Sengottai railway line due to ongoing gauge conversion works between Edamann and Bhagavathipuram railway stations on the rail stretch.

In 2017, services on Kollam–Edamon stretch resumed. Indian railway is connecting Edamon with various cities in India including Kollam, Thiruvananthapuram, Ernakulam, Thrissur, Kottayam & with various towns like Punalur, Paravur, Kayamkulam, Karunagappalli, Varkala, Tiruvalla and Changanassery.

Services

See also

References

Edamann
Madurai railway division
1904 establishments in India
Railway stations opened in 1904